Scott Firth (born 2 March 2001) is a Canadian professional soccer player who plays as a midfielder.

Club career

Early career
Before turning pro, Firth played youth soccer for local club Suburban FC. In 2015 and 2016 he had trials with Portuguese clubs Sporting CP and Benfica. In 2018 Firth was invited back for a second trial with Toronto FC of Major League Soccer.

HFX Wanderers
On 30 January 2019, Firth signed his first professional contract with his hometown club, HFX Wanderers, becoming the first Nova Scotian to sign for the new Canadian Premier League side. On 4 May 2019, Firth made his debut as a substitute in the club's inaugural home match. He made eight league appearances that season and one in the Canadian Championship. On 19 November 2019, Firth re-signed with Halifax for the 2020 season. He departed the club at the end of the 2021 season.

Honours
HFX Wanderers
 Canadian Premier League
Runners-up: 2020

References

External links

2001 births
Living people
Association football midfielders
Canadian soccer players
Soccer people from Nova Scotia
Sportspeople from Halifax, Nova Scotia
HFX Wanderers FC players
Canadian Premier League players